Eurotower may refer to:

 Eurotower (Frankfurt am Main), a high-rise building in Frankfurt, Germany, once a headquarters of the European Central Bank
 Eurotower (Zagreb), a high-rise building in Zagreb, Croatia, headquarters of the Zagreb Stock Exchange
 Euro Tower (Bucharest), a high-rise building in Bucharest, Romania, mainly headquarters of the company eSilicon

Buildings and structures disambiguation pages